This is a list of National Junior Classical League conventions.

Reference 

 National Junior Classical League

Conventions (meetings)